Persikabo Bogor was a football club based in Cibinong, Bogor Regency. They competed for the last time in Liga 3 2018, the third tier of Indonesian football. Their home stadium was Pakansari Stadium and also used Persikabo Stadium for training facilities. 
Persikabo Bogor had their nicknames "Pajajaran Warrior" and "The Pajajaran Panther". Persikabo merged with PS TIRA (Previously known as Persiram Raja Ampat) in 2019 so they can compete instantly in Liga 1 without promotion as PS TIRA-Persikabo.

Achievements & honors 
Liga Indonesia Second Division
Winners (1): 1995

History

Stadium
Persikabo initially played at Pajajaran Stadium in Bogor City shared with PSB Bogor, and they later moved to the newly built Persikabo Stadium (Known as Stadion Pemda) located at Bogor Regency Government Building Complex, Cibinong. Persikabo Stadium was later used as training ground when they moved to Pakansari Stadium in 2014. Pakansari Stadium, a bigger stadium that is only 2 km away from their old ground or their current training ground, is now in use after the club merged with PS TIRA.

Supporters and rivalries
Persikabo Supporters were called Kabomania, after the merger the supporters continue to support Persikabo 1973

References

External links
 Official Website (Indonesian)

Football clubs in Indonesia
Defunct football clubs in Indonesia
1973 establishments in Indonesia
Association football clubs established in 1973
Association football clubs disestablished in 2019